Kidderminster Harriers Football Club is an English football club based in Kidderminster, Worcestershire.

The club participates in the National League North, the sixth tier of English football. Formed in 1886, Kidderminster have played at Aggborough Stadium since they were formed. They are the only club from Worcestershire ever to have played in the Football League.

Key

Key to league record:
Pld = Games played
W = Won
D = Drawn
L = Lost
GF = Goals For
GA = Goals Against
Pts = Points
Pos = Final Position

Key to rounds:
1Q = 1st qualifying round
2Q = 2nd qualifying round
3Q = 3rd qualifying round
4Q = 4th qualifying round
R1 = Round 1
R2 = Round 2
R3 = Round 3

R4 = Round 4
R5 = Round 5
QF = Quarter-finals
SF = Semi-finals
F = Finalists
W = Winners

AR1 = Area round 1
AR2 = Area round 2
AQF = Area quarter-finals
ASF = Area semi-finals
AF = Area final

Seasons

Footnotes

References

Seasons
 
English football club seasons